Rama Jacqueline Aol  (née Aol Jacqueline), also Aol Rama, (born 26 January 1969) is a female Ugandan politician and a social worker.  She is the district woman representative of Nebbi District in the 10th Ugandan Parliament (2016 to 2021). Aol belongs to the ruling National Resistance Movement (NRM) political party.

Background and education 
Aol is married. Below is her detailed educational background:

Career before politics 
In 2005, she worked as a counselor at Serenity Centre. Later in the same year, she joined Community Action Against Alcoholism and Drug Abuse as a director to date. Between 2006 and 2013, she served as board member at the Arua Technical Institute, Ragem.  Between 2010 and 2014, Aol worked as the chairperson at the West Nile Consortium on Elimination of Gender Based Violence. From 2007 to 2015,  she worked as a journalist at the Arua Diocese Media Centre-Radio Pacis. From 1991 to 2001, she served as the Clerical Officer at Nebbi District Local Government and also worked as the Clerical Officer at the Judiciary Department between 1986 and 1991.

Political career 
Before joining the Parliament of Uganda as the Member of Parliament  for the Nebbi District in 2016, Aol served as the  speaker of Oluk Sub-County, Arua District from 2011 to 2014.

Aol serves on additional role at the Parliament of Uganda as the Committee on Equal Opportunities and Agriculture. She also serves under the  full membership of professional bodies of the Uganda Journalists Union.

See also 
 Parliament of Uganda
 List of members of the tenth Parliament of Uganda
 Nebbi District

References

External links 
Website of the Parliament of Uganda
Aol Jacqueline Rama on Facebook
Aol Jacqueline Rama on Linkedin

1969 births
Living people
Members of the Parliament of Uganda
Women members of the Parliament of Uganda
National Resistance Movement politicians
21st-century Ugandan women politicians
21st-century Ugandan politicians
People from Nebbi District
People from Arua District